SS Volturno may refer to:

 , a British ocean liner that caught fire and sank in October 1913
 , an Italian bulk carrier sunk in World War I by German submarine  in March 1918

Ship names